Ratnam may refer to

People 
Anita Ratnam, Indian dancer
A.M. Ratnam, Indian film producer
Kakani Venkata Ratnam, Indian politician
Mani Ratnam, Indian film director
Samantha Ratnam, Australian social worker and politician
Suhasini Ratnam, Indian actress
Raghupathi Venkataratnam Naidu, Indian social reformer
Madineni Venkat Ratnam, Indian atmospheric scientist

Cinema 
Money Ratnam, Malayalam film
Rangula Ratnam (1966 film), a 1966 Telugu film
Rangula Ratnam (2018 film), a 2018 Telugu film

Other 
Ratnam SC, Sri Lankan football club